The Four is a 2008 Hong Kong television series produced by TVB. The series is adapted from Woon Swee Oan's novel Si Da Ming Bu (四大名捕; The Four Great Constables). The novel tells the story of four young constables: Heartless, Iron Fist, Chaser, and Cold Blood, who work together to solve cases and attempt to bring down the corrupt Prime Minister of the Song Dynasty. The series is shown to celebrate TVB's 41st Anniversary.

Cast
 Note: Some of the characters' names are in Cantonese romanisation.

Main cast

Divine Constabulary

Blue Sky Sect

The Federation

Royal Court

Teet family

Other cast

Viewership ratings

Awards and nominations
41st TVB Anniversary Awards (2008)
 "Best Drama"
 "My Favourite Male Character Role" (Ron Ng - Lang Ling-Hei (Cold Blood))

References

External links
TVB.com The Four - Official Website 
Astro On Demand.com The Four - Astro Official Website 
BATGWA.com The Four - News on Costume Fitting Ceremony 
YouTube.com The Four - Trailer
K for TVB Themesong Lyrics

TVB dramas
Hong Kong wuxia television series
Adaptations of works by Woon Swee Oan
Television series set in the Northern Song
2008 Hong Kong television series debuts
2008 Hong Kong television series endings